Pearl Hannah Savin (20 June 1914 – 19 November 2000) was a New Zealand cricketer who played as a wicket-keeper. She played in one Test match for New Zealand, their first, in 1935, the only official match she ever played.

References

External links
 
 
 "Pearl in Whites" at New Zealand Cricket Museum website

1914 births
2000 deaths
Cricketers from Christchurch
New Zealand women cricketers
New Zealand women Test cricketers